Mount Lebanon IV is an electoral district in Lebanon, as per the 2017 vote law. The district elects 13 members of the Lebanese National Assembly - 5 Maronites, 4 Druze, 2 Sunni, 1 Greek Catholic and 1 Greek Orthodox. The constituency contains two 'minor districts', Aley (corresponding to Aley District) and Chouf (corresponding to Chouf District). The Aley 'minor district' elects 2 Druze, 2 Maronite and 1 Greek Orthodox parliamentarian, whilst the Chouf 'minor district' elects 3 Maronite, 2 Druze, 2 Sunni and 1 Greek Catholic parliamentarians.

Electorate
40.5% of the electorate is Druze, 27% Maronite, 18.7% Sunni, 5.18% Greek Catholic, 5.14% Greek Orthodox, 2.6% Shia and 0.91% belongs to other Christian communities.

Below data by 'minor district' from 2017;

2018 election
Ahead of the 2018 Lebanese general election 6 lists were registered.

The battle was expected to be mainly between two lists: the "Reconciliation" (Progressive Socialist Party-Future Movement-Lebanese Forces) list and the "Mountain Pledge" (Lebanese Democratic Party-Free Patriotic Movement-Syrian Social Nationalist Party) list. The remaining lists were the "Free Decision" (Kataeb Party and National Liberal Party) list, the "National Unity" list of Wiam Wahhab (former Minister, ex-LDP), the "Civic" list and the "Kulluna Watani" (We are all National) list.

Towards the end of February the Democratic Renewal Movement candidate Antoine Haddad announced his withdrawal from the race.

Result by lists

Result by candidate

References

Electoral districts of Lebanon